Ivana Varagić (born 31 August 1992) is a Montenegrin footballer who plays as a midfielder. She has officially played for the senior Montenegro women's national team.

International career
Varagić capped for Montenegro at senior level during the 2015 FIFA Women's World Cup qualification – UEFA Group 6, in a 0–10 home loss to England on 17 September 2014.

References

1992 births
Living people
Women's association football midfielders
Montenegrin women's footballers
Montenegro women's international footballers